The Busy Body is a 1967 American comedy film directed and produced by William Castle and based on Donald E. Westlake's novel of the same name.  It was Richard Pryor's film debut.

Plot
George Norton is a low-level bumbler who works for Chicago crime boss Charley Barker. A well-dressed mama's boy, George is in good standing with Barker, even gaining a promotion, until an incident that costs the mob a million dollars.

George is indirectly responsible when Archie, a mob courier, is killed at a barbecue. After the funeral, Barker instructs George to dig up Archie's body because $500,000 was stuffed inside the lining of each side of a blue suit that an unwitting George personally chose for the burial.

George opens the casket to find it empty, then later occupied by a different corpse. He sets out to retrieve the body and the money before Barker gets angry enough to arrange a funeral for HIM.

Cast
 Sid Caesar as George
 Robert Ryan as Charley
 Anne Baxter as Margo
 Kay Medford as Ma Norton
 Jan Murray as Murray
 Richard Pryor as Lt. Whitaker
 Dom DeLuise as Kurt
 Godfrey Cambridge as Mike
 Bill Dana as Archie
 Arlene Golonka as Bobbi
 Charles McGraw as Fred Harwell
 Ben Blue as Felix Rose
 Marty Ingels as Willie
 George Jessel as Mr. Fessel
 Paul Wexler as Mr. Merriwether
 Don Brodie as Board Member

See also
List of American films of 1967

References

External links
 
 

1967 films
American independent films
Films based on American novels
Films based on works by Donald E. Westlake
Films directed by William Castle
Films scored by Vic Mizzy
1960s crime comedy films
American crime comedy films
Paramount Pictures films
1967 comedy films
1960s English-language films
1960s American films